Germany competed at the 1992 Winter Olympics in Albertville, France.  It was the first time that the nation had competed at the Olympic Games following reunification in 1990.  Previously, West Germany and East Germany had sent independent teams to the Games.

Competitors
The following is the list of number of competitors in the Games.

Medalists

Alpine skiing

Men

Men's combined

Women

Women's combined

Biathlon

Men

Men's 4 x 7.5 km relay

Women

Women's 3 x 7.5 km relay

 1 A penalty loop of 150 metres had to be skied per missed target.
 2 One minute added per missed target.

Bobsleigh

Cross-country skiing

Men

 1 Starting delay based on 10 km results. 
 C = Classical style, F = Freestyle

Men's 4 × 10 km relay

Women

 2 Starting delay based on 5 km results. 
 C = Classical style, F = Freestyle

Women's 4 × 5 km relay

Figure skating

Women

Pairs

Freestyle skiing

Men

Women

Ice hockey

Group A
Twelve participating teams were placed in two groups. After playing a round-robin, the top four teams in each group advanced to the Medal Round while the last two teams competed in the Consolation Round for the 9th to 12th places.

Final round
Quarter-finals

Consolation Round 5th-8th Places

5th Place Match

Team Roster
Karl Friesen
Helmut de Raaf
Josef Heiß
Mike Heidt
Udo Kiessling
Rick Amann
Uli Hiemer
Mike Schmidt
Jörg Mayr
Ron Fischer
Michael Rumrich
Georg Holzmann
Jürgen Rumrich
Bernd Truntschka
Gerd Truntschka
Dieter Hegen
Ernst Köpf
Peter Draisaitl
Andreas Brockmann
Raimund Hilger
Thomas Brandl
Axel Kammerer
Andreas Niederberger
Head Coaches: Ludĕk Bukač and Franz Reindl

Luge

Men

(Men's) Doubles

Women

Nordic combined 

Men's individual

Events:
 normal hill ski jumping 
 15 km cross-country skiing 

Men's Team

Three participants per team.

Events:
 normal hill ski jumping 
 10 km cross-country skiing

Ski jumping 

Men's team large hill

 1 Four teams members performed two jumps each. The best three were counted.

Speed skating

Men

Women

References

Official Olympic Reports
International Olympic Committee results database
 Olympic Winter Games 1992, full results by sports-reference.com

Nations at the 1992 Winter Olympics
1992
Winter Olympics